Boris Vujčić (born 2 June 1964) is a Croatian economist, university professor, and the Governor of the Croatian National Bank, a position he has held since 2012.

Early life
Vujčić graduated from the Zagreb Faculty of Economics in 1988, where he also received his doctorate in 1996.

Career
Vujčić started his professional career in 1989 as an assistant at the Zagreb Faculty of Economics. In 1996 he was named the head of research department of the Croatian National Bank. Later, in 1997, he became a lecturer at the Zagreb Faculty of Economics and in 2003 an associate professor.

Since 2000, Vujčić has held the position of Vice Governor of the Croatian National Bank, and in 2012 he assumed the position of the governor. He held that position upon Croatia's accession to the European Union. In 2018 the coalition government of prime minister Andrej Plenković agreed to re-appoint Vujčić for a second six-year term.

Other activities
 European Central Bank (ECB), ex-officio member of the Governing Council
 European Systemic Risk Board (ESRB), ex-officio member
 Vienna Initiative 2.0, member of the Steering Committee
 International Monetary Fund (IMF), ex-officio member of the Board of Governors

Policy positions
During Vujčić's time in office, the Central Bank's monetary policy has largely revolved around keeping the Croatian kuna stable against the euro in a managed float regime. Early in his term, he stated that it remained in Croatia's best interests to join the euro. However, he refused an international bailout scenario as the country faced the post-2008 financial crisis.

Controversy
In 2014, Vujčić faced calls for his resignation from holders of loans denominated in Swiss francs who struggled with repayments when the kuna surged that year.

In 2017, Croatia's State Commission for Conflict of Interest investigated whether Vujčić allowed a conflict of interest by several times attending an economic conference in Kitzbühel sponsored by UniCredit, the owner of the country's biggest commercial bank Zagrebačka banka.

References

External links
Biography at the Croatian National Bank website

1964 births
Living people
Academic staff of the University of Zagreb
20th-century Croatian economists
Monetary economists
Governors of the Croatian National Bank
Faculty of Economics and Business, University of Zagreb alumni
21st-century Croatian economists